Deportivo Independiente Medellín, also known as Independiente Medellín or DIM, is a Colombian professional football club based in Medellín that currently plays in the Categoría Primera A. They play their home games at Estadio Atanasio Girardot, which seats 40,943 people, and is also shared with city rivals Atlético Nacional. The team is dubbed "El Poderoso de la Montaña" (Mighty of the Mountain) due to Medellín's geographical location high in the Andes mountains. 

Founded in 1913, Independiente Medellín has won the Categoría Primera A six times: in 1955, 1957, 2002–II, 2004–I, 2009–II, and 2016–I, and the Copa Colombia three times: in 1981, 2019, and 2020. Its best performance at international level was in 2003, when the team reached the semifinals of the Copa Libertadores.

Independiente Medellín has a rivalry with Atlético Nacional, and the teams face each other in El Clásico Paisa, which is considered one of the most important derbies in the country.

History

Early years 
Independiente Medellín was founded on 14 November 1913 under the name of Medellín Foot Ball Club by siblings Alberto, Luis, and Rafael Uribe Piedrahíta. The team played its first match with an amateur team called Sporting of Medellín, who defeated them 11–0. In 1948, Medellín joined professional football and played the first edition of the league. Medellín placed seventh out of 10 teams, winning seven matches. Their first match was a 4–0 defeat against América de Cali. Their first win was 3–2 against Junior.

The next decade, Medellín signed Peruvian Segundo Castillo Varela, who won the 1939 South American Championship, the first title of his country, in a movement of what was known as El Dorado, when Colombian teams signed many foreign footballers. Medellín did not play in 1952 and 1953 due to economic problems. In 1953, the club changed its entire administration and was renamed to its current name, Deportivo Independiente Medellín.

First three titles 
The team won its first title in the 1955 Campeonato Profesional, finishing first with 31 points and just one defeat. Argentine striker Felipe Marino was the tournament's top goalscorer, with 22 goals. The team won its second title two years later, in 1957, with almost the same players as the previous seasons. José Vicente Grecco was the top scorer of the tournament.

In 1966, Medellín achieved their first ever qualification for the Copa Libertadores, after finishing runner-up in the league. They played against Argentine sides Racing de Avellaneda and River Plate, Bolivian teams 31 de Octubre and Bolívar, and fellow Colombians Independiente Santa Fe. They finished fifth out of six in their group and were eliminated. They qualified for the Copa Libertadores again after 27 years in 1994, being eliminated by Junior in the quarter-finals.

Independiente Medellin won its first Copa Colombia in 1981, although this title is not officially recognized by many experts nor by DIMAYOR, it is recognized by CONMEBOL.

1989 season controversy 
In 1989, a year where Medellín had one of the best teams in the league and was expected to win the title, a tragic event occurred in Colombian football. In one of the final games of the season, Medellín tied América de Cali 0–0 at home. During the game, linesman Álvaro Ortega disallowed a Medellín goal, angering many people. Afterwards, a person that had been reportedly sent by Pablo Escobar hunted down the linesman and murdered him. An anonymous caller said they had betted on the game and the disallowed goal made them lose a lot of money. In response, the Colombian Football Federation decided to cancel the rest of the season, which left the 1989 league season without a winner.

1993 runner-up 
On 19 December 1993, during the last game of the season, Medellín and Atlético Junior were fighting for a tight first place, as both clubs had the same number of points. Junior was playing América de Cali at home in Barranquilla while simultaneously Medellín played hometown rivals Atlético Nacional. The games were to start simultaneously. A Medellín win combined with a Junior loss or draw would give Medellín the title. But if Medellín drew and Junior did as well, then Junior would win the title. At halftime América were leading the game in Barranquilla 1–0 and in Medellin the game was still 0–0, meaning that at that moment América were winning the title due to the draw in Medellín. Junior scored two goals to put the game at 2–1 with ten minutes remaining, and Independiente Medellín scored at the same time to put the game in their favor 1–0. América tied the game at 2–2 with seven minutes remaining. The match in Medellín ended with Independiente Medellín winning 1–0 while awaiting the 2–2 game in Barranquilla to end, which still had five minutes remaining due to a delay at the start of the second half. Medellín players were celebrating with a victory lap and giving interviews with reporters white they waited for the final whistle in Barranquilla. However, Oswaldo Mackenzie scored a late goal in the 89th minute and gave Junior the 3–2 win and the title, leaving the Medellín players and fans heartbroken.

1999–2009: End of title drought and glory days 
El Poderoso had a great 1999 season, finishing in the top eight of both Apertura and Finalización tournaments, and finishing fourth in the aggregate table. This season was different from the standard format; in the Apertura tournament there were no playoffs. The Finalizacion tournament had playoffs, where Medellin topped their group and qualified for the Finalizacion finals against city rivals Nacional. However, Nacional won 1–0, and went on to win the league title, while Medellin missed out on a spot for the 2000 Copa Libertadores.  
Medellin came close to winning their third league title in 2001 thanks to Jorge Serna's prolific goalscoring, who finished as top scorer tied with Carlos Castro on 29 goals. The club ended up losing the final to América de Cali 3–0 on aggregate, although they reached the final in an unexpected manner; in the regular season they finished in 10th place and occupied the last seed for the eight teams that qualified for the playoffs through the aggregate table. After 45 long years of agony, Medellín won its third league title in the 2002 Finalización tournament under manager Víctor Luna, who replaced Reinaldo Rueda halfway through the season after he was sacked due to poor results. Medellín played against Deportivo Pasto in the two-legged final. El Rojo Paisa beat Pasto 2–0 at home in the first leg with goals from Robinson Muñoz and an own goal from Julio César Valencia. In the second leg on 23 December 2002, Medellín drew 1–1 away from home, with Mauricio Molina scoring Medellín's goal from a free-kick, meaning they became champions with a 3–1 aggregate score. 

The 2002 league title gave the club a spot in the 2003 Copa Libertadores, where they qualified for the knockout stages by topping their group, which consisted of Boca Juniors, Barcelona, and Colo-Colo, with twelve points and a total of four wins and two losses. During the group stage, the club famously beat Bianchi's Boca Juniors, 1–0. "Medallo" beat Cerro Porteño on penalties in the round of 16 and Grêmio in the quarter-finals. In the semi-finals, they faced Santos. In the first leg played at Estádio Urbano Caldeira, DIM lost 1–0. In the second leg at home, Tressor Moreno scored first to level the aggregate score at 1–1, but the club eventually lost the game 3–2 (4–2 on aggregate) and was eliminated, narrowly missing out for the final, which would have been played against their group stage opponent, Boca Juniors.

In 2004, Medellín and Nacional qualified for the final of the Apertura tournament; in Antioquia everybody was very excited because this was the first "Paisa" final in the league's history. The final was played over two legs, both at Atanasio Girardot: in the first leg, Medellín won 2–1 with goals scored by Rafael Castillo and Jorge Horacio Serna. The second leg was played on 27 June; it ended 0–0 and Medellín became the champion of the 2004 Apertura, its fourth league title, won under manager Pedro Sarmiento.

In the 2005 Copa Libertadores, the club topped their group, which was made up of Atletico Paranaense, América de Cali, and Libertad. They also unexpectedly beat Paranaense 4–0 away in Curitiba on their way to the round of 16, where they faced Banfield and lost 5–0 on aggregate.

For the 2008 Finalización, the club almost won its fifth title, but lost the final to América de Cali with Santiago Escobar as head coach. The next season, the 2009 Apertura, was very poor; the team finished in last place. However, in the 2009 Torneo Finalización, with the departure of Santiago Escobar as head coach, his assistant, Leonel Álvarez, replaced him, and the team got its fifth title, beating Atlético Huila 3–2 on aggregate. In that season, Jackson Martinez broke the league's top scoring record with 18 goals (the previous record was Léider Preciado's 17 goals), a record that was broken again later by Cortuluá forward Miguel Borja in 2016, with 19 goals.

2010–present: Back-to-back runner-ups and sixth league title 
During the 2010s, DIM was close to winning league titles several times. In 2012, they faced Millonarios in the Torneo Finalización final and lost on penalties. In 2014, they finished as runners-up to Independiente Santa Fe in that year's Finalización tournament. Six months later they made the final again, this time losing to Deportivo Cali. These losses were finally overcome in the 2016 season, where the club won its sixth league title. In the Apertura tournament, they finished first in the regular season table with 40 points. Then they eliminated Deportivo Cali and Cortuluá in the playoffs to set up a final with Junior; the first leg in Barranquilla ended 1–1 and the second leg was won by Medellín 2–0, with Christian Marrugo scoring a brace and securing a 3–1 aggregate victory.

With the 2016 league title, El Poderoso gained a spot in the 2017 Copa Libertadores, returning to the tournament for the first time since 2010. They were placed in Group 3 along with River Plate, Emelec, and Melgar. The club placed third in the group and was transferred to the Copa Sudamericana, where they eventually lost to Racing Club in the second round. One of the highlights of their Copa Libertadores run was beating powerhouse River Plate 2–1 at Estadio Monumental.

Rivalries

Medellín's greatest rivalry is with the city's other major club, Atlético Nacional. Both clubs share the same stadium; Atanasio Girardot. Atletico Nacional has a clear advantage over Independiente Medellin in titles won, with 30 titles (most in Colombia) to Medellin's 9 titles. However, Nacional has never beaten Medellin in a final, since they lost in the 2004 Apertura. This was considered as a very shocking result, since Nacional's squad had a much higher value that Medellin's.

The rivalry is especially strong due to each team's main fanbases; Rexixtenxia Norte for Medellín and Los Del Sur for Atlético Nacional. There are often fights between these two fanbases, which is why sometimes only the fanbase of one team is allowed entry. The two clubs are named with the location that they occupy in the stadium; Rexixtenxia Norte occupies the section behind the northern goal and Los Del Sur occupy the section behind the southern goal. 

The first Clásico Paisa was played on 12 September 1948, where Medellín beat Nacional 3–0. Over 300 matches have been played between the two clubs, with Nacional dominating the historical record by 40 wins.

The club also has minor rivalries with other clubs in the Medellin Metropolitan Area, such as Rionegro Águilas, Leones, and Envigado.    Although none of these teams have won top-flight titles, matches between them still draw attention due to their close geographical location, meaning games like these usually sellout.

Honours

Official 
 Categoría Primera A: 
Winners (6): 1955, 1957, 2002–II, 2004–I, 2009–II, 2016–I
Runners-up (11): 1959, 1961, 1966, 1993, 2001, 2008–II, 2012–II, 2014–II, 2015–I, 2018–II, 2022–II
 Copa Colombia: 
Winners (3): 1981, 2019, 2020
Runners-up (2): 1955–56, 2017
Superliga Colombiana:
Runners-up (1): 2017

Amateur 

 Copa Jimenez Jaramillo (1): 1923
 Campeonato Nacional (7): 1918, 1920, 1922, 1930, 1936, 1937, 1938
 Campeonato Departamental (8): 1937, 1938, 1939, 1941, 1942, 1943, 1944, 1945

Friendly tournaments
 Copa Club Unión: 1942
 Triangular ‘Trofeo Coltejer’: 1955
 Torneo "Medellín sin tugurios": 1983
 Copa Montreal (Canada): 1992
 Copa DC United: 1994
 Copa Ciudad de Popayán: 2005
 Copa Gobernación de Antioquia: 2008, 2010
 Copa del Pacífico: 2009
 Copa Movilco– Gobernación del Meta Runner-up: 2009
 Copa del Pacífico Runner-up: 2010

Performance in CONMEBOL competitions
Copa Libertadores: 9 appearances
1967: First round
1994: Quarter-finals
2003: Semi-finals (third place)
2005: Round of 16
2009: Group stage
2010: Second round
2017: Group stage
2019: Second stage
2020: Group stage

Copa Sudamericana: 4 appearances
2006: First round
2016: Quarter-finals
2017: First round
2018: First round

Copa Conmebol: 1 appearance
1995: First round

Players

Current squad

Out on loan

Club statistics

Top scorers

Most appearances

Managers

 Delfín Benítez Cáceres (1954–57)
 José Manuel Moreno (1957)
 René Seghini (1957–58)
 Pedro Roque Retamozo (interim) (1958)
 René Seghini  (1958–59)
 Fernando Paternoster (1960)
 Efraín Sánchez (1960)
 José Manuel Moreno (1960–62)
 Carlos Alberto Díaz (1962)
 Efraín Sánchez (1962–63)
 José Vicente Grecco (1963)
 Luis López García (1963–64)
 José Vicente Grecco (1964–66)
 Francisco Hormazábal (1966–67)
 Leonel Vargas (interim) (1967)
 Rodrigo Fonnegra (1968–70)
 Héctor Molina (interim) (1969)
 Humberto Álvarez (interim) (1969)
 Ricardo Ramaciotti (1972)
 Francisco Hormazábal (1972–74)
 Humberto Ortiz (1974–75)
 José Vicente Grecco (1975)
 Juan José Pizzuti (1975–76)
 Justo Lopera (1976)
 Edilberto Righi & Pedro Soma (1976–77)
 Darío Velez (interim) (1977)
 Efraín Sánchez (1977–78)
 Bernardo Valencia (interim) (1978–79)
 Néstor Togneri (1978–79)
 Bernando Valencia (1979)
 Víctor Rodríguez (1980)
 Ricardo Ramaciotti (1980)
 Leonel Montoya (1981)
 Jorge Olmedo (1982)
  Julio Comesaña (1982–86)
 Carlos Miguel Diaz (interim) (1983)
 Bernando Valencia (1986)
 Ricardo Ramaciotti (1986–87)
 German Aceros (1987–88)
 Gonzalo Montoya (interim) (1988)
 Hugo Gallego (1988)
 Jaime Rodríguez (1989–91)
  Julio Comesaña (1992)
 Hugo Gallego (1992)
 Nelson Gallego (1992)
 Luis Augusto García (1993–95)
 Juan Mujica (1994)
 Nolberto Molina (1995)
 Jairo Rios (1995–96)
 Carlos Restrepo (1996–97)
 Víctor Luna (1997)
 Zlatko Petričević (1997)
 Fernando Castro (1998–98)
 Óscar Aristizábal (1998–99)
  Julio Comesaña (2000)
 Víctor Luna (2000)
 Juan José Peláez (2000–02)
 Álvaro Escobar (interim) (2000–01)
 Reynaldo Rueda (2002)
 Víctor Luna (2002–03)
 Jaime Rodríguez (2003–04)
 Pedro Sarmiento (1 July 2004 – 30 June 2005)
 Javier Álvarez (2005–06)
 Édgar Carvajal (interim) (2006)
 Víctor Luna (2006–07)
 Juan José Peláez (2007–08)
 Santiago Escobar (1 December 2008 – 19 May 2009)
 Leonel Álvarez (19 May 2009 – 25 May 2010)
 Édgar Carvajal (1 May 2010 – 31 March 2011)
 Víctor Luna (1 April 2011 – 22 May 2011)
 Guillermo Berrío (30 April 2011 – 13 February 2012)
 Hernán Darío Gómez (13 February 2012 – 19 April 2013)
 Pedro Sarmiento (3 September 2013 – 21 February 2014)
 Hernán Torres (21 February 2014 – May 2015)
 Leonel Álvarez (May 2015 – December 2016)
 Luis Zubeldía (December 2016 – June 2017)
 Juan José Peláez (June 2017 – October 2017)
 Ismael Rescalvo (December 2017 – June 2018)
  Octavio Zambrano (June 2018 – April 2019)
 Alexis Mendoza (May 2019 – September 2019)
 Aldo Bobadilla (September 2019 – September 2020)
 Hernán Darío Gómez (December 2020 – September 2021)
  Julio Comesaña (September 2021 – June 2022)
 David González (June 2022 – present)

Presidents
This is the list of presidents of Independiente Medellín since its foundation:

 José Luis Restrepo Jaramillo (1913–1928)
 Luis Eduardo Ramírez (1929–1933)
 Jesus Maria Burgos (1933–1938)
 Bernardo Munera A. (1940–1947)
 Federico Kahn (1948)
 Alejandro Cano (1948–1951)
 Ignacio Gómez (1953–1954) 
 Javier Arriola (1954–1958)
 Alfonso Arriola (1959–1970)
 Oscar Serna Mejía (1971–1974)
 Gustavo Arbeláez (1974)
 Gabriel Toro Pérez (1975–1977)
 Oscar Serna Mejía (1978)
 Hernán Gómez Agudelo (1978–1979)
 Pablo Correa Ramos (1979–1981)
 Oscar Serna Mejía (1981)
 Héctor Mesa Gómez (1981–1983)
 Oscar Serna Mejía (1984–1985)
 Pablo Correa Ramos (1985)
 Mario de Jesus Valderrama (1986–1987)
 Gabriel Toro Pérez (1987)
 Luis Fernando Correa (1987)
 Humberto Betancur (1987–1988)
 Hernán Gómez Agudelo (1988–989)
 Antonio Mesa Escobar (1989–1991)
 Alberto Montoya Callejas (1991–1992)
 Jesús Aristizábal Guevara (1992)
 Julio Villate (1992–1995)
 Jorge Castillo (1995–1997)
 Mario de Jesus Valderrama (1998–2000)
 Javier Velásquez (2001–2005) 
 Juan Guillermo Montoya (2005–2006)
 John Cardona Arteaga (2006)
 Carlos Alberto Palacio Acosta (2006–2008)
 Jorge Alberto Osorio (2008–2012)
 Julio Roberto Gómez 2012–2013 
 Carlos Mario Mejía (2013–2014)
 Eduardo Silva Meluk (2014–2018)
 Michael Gil Gómez (2019)
 Jairo Vélez (2020)
 Daniel Ossa Giraldo (2021–present)

References

External links

Official website 

 
Football clubs in Colombia
Association football clubs established in 1913
Independiente Medellín
Categoría Primera A clubs